Attack class may refer to:
Attack-class patrol boat, a former class of  coastal defence vessels operated the Royal Australian Navy 
Attack-class submarine, a proposed Australian class of conventional submarines